The  is an electric multiple unit (EMU) commuter train type operated by the private railway operator Keihan Electric Railway on the Keihan Uji Line and other lines in Kyoto, Japan, since April 2012.

Design
The overall design concept draws on the design of the 3000 series EMU trains introduced from 2008.

The new trains include energy-saving and environmentally friendly features. The 13000 series trains will use 35% less power than the 2600 series they are intended to replace, and produce less environmental noise in service. The cars feature aluminium alloy bodies with a semi-double skin construction, and incorporate increased crash resistance.

The end cars are each equipped with one PT-4805-A scissors-type pantograph recycled from withdrawn rolling stock.

Interior
Internally, LCD passenger information screens are provided above doorways.

The interior flooring design is intended to evoke an image of Kyoto's traditional stone-paved streets.

The 2nd-batch sets, 13006 onward, use LED lighting.

Formations
, the fleet consists of seven four-car sets (13001 to 13007) and five seven-car sets (13021 to 13025), formed as follows, with the Mc1/Mc3 cars at the Kyoto/Uji end.

4-car sets

Odd-numbered sets

Even-numbered sets

 "Mc" cars are motored driving cars (with driving cabs).
 "T" cars are unpowered trailer cars.
 The Mc cars each have one PT-4805-A scissors-type pantograph.
 The Kyoto/Uji end Mc3 cars of even-numbered sets are fitted with gangway connections, enabling coupling to the Nakanoshima end Mc4 cars of odd-numbered sets.

7-car sets

The three motored cars (Mc1, M1, and Mc2 cars) each have one scissors-type pantograph. The "T0" car is designated as a "mildly air conditioned" car.

History
The first set, 13001, was delivered from the Kawasaki Heavy Industries factory in Kobe to Keihan's Neyagawa Depot in March 2012. It entered service on 14 April 2012. The second set, 13002, entered revenue service on 30 May 2012.

From 9 June 2012, 13000 series sets were also introduced on the Keihan Katano Line.

The first second-batch set, 13006, entered service on 7 April 2014, followed by two 7-car sets, 13021 and 13022, which entered service in May 2014. 

The fleet began operation on the Keihan Main Line on 30 May 2014.

The third batch of sets was delivered between 2016 and 2017.

Fleet history
The build history for the fleet is as shown below. All sets were manufactured by Kawasaki Heavy Industries.

References

External links

  

Electric multiple units of Japan
13000 series
Train-related introductions in 2012
Kawasaki multiple units
1500 V DC multiple units of Japan